The National Society Daughters of the American Colonists (NSDAC) is an organization of female descendants of American colonials.  Its mission is education on the Colonial history of the United States.

Membership
Membership in NSDAC is open to female citizens of the United States who are at least 18 years old and are lineal descendants of anyone, male or female, who served in a militia or in civil service in any of the Thirteen Colonies prior to July 4, 1776.  Applicants must also meet unspecified moral criteria. 
   NSDAC was founded on December 9, 1920, incorporated on April 25, 1921, organized in St. Louis on May 26, 1921 and the federal charter was granted on October 30, 1984.

Notable members 
 Margaret Wootten Collier
 Lynn Forney Young

External links
http://www.nsdac.org

References 

Lineage societies
Clubs and societies in the United States
Patriotic and national organizations chartered by the United States Congress
Embassy Row
Women's organizations based in the United States
Organizations based in Washington, D.C.